Cardozie Darnell Jones II (born November 23, 1949) is a Senior United States district judge of the United States District Court for the Eastern District of Pennsylvania.

Education and career

Born in Claremore, Oklahoma, Jones received an Artium Baccalaureus degree in French from Southwestern College in 1972, and a Juris Doctor from the American University Washington College of Law in 1975.

He served in the Defender Association of Philadelphia from 1975 to 1987. He was an adjunct professor at St. Joseph's University School of Criminal Justice from 1991 to 1992, at the Temple University Beasley School of Law from 1992 to 1996 and the University of Pennsylvania Law School from 1993 to the present. He was a Curriculum developer/instructor, The National Judicial College from 1998 to 2008. He was a judge on the First Judicial District, Philadelphia Court of Common Pleas from 1987 to 2008, serving as President judge from 2006 to 2008.

Federal judicial service

On July 24, 2008, Jones was nominated by President George W. Bush to a seat on the United States District Court for the Eastern District of Pennsylvania vacated by Bruce William Kauffman. Jones was confirmed by the United States Senate on September 26, 2008, and received his commission on October 30, 2008. He assumed senior status on March 15, 2021.

See also 
 List of African-American federal judges
 List of African-American jurists

References

External links

1949 births
Living people
21st-century American judges
African-American judges
Judges of the United States District Court for the Eastern District of Pennsylvania
People from Claremore, Oklahoma
Public defenders
Southwestern College (Kansas) alumni
United States district court judges appointed by George W. Bush
University of Pennsylvania Law School faculty
Washington College of Law alumni